Bruno André Cavaco Jordão (born 12 October 1998) is a Portuguese professional footballer who plays as a midfielder for C.D. Santa Clara, on loan from Wolverhampton Wanderers.

Club career

Early career
Born in Marinha Grande, Leiria District, Jordão began his career at U.D. Leiria. He became their youngest player and goalscorer of all time in the 2015–16 Campeonato de Portugal, and in July 2016 he transferred to S.C. Braga.

On 20 August 2016, Jordão made his professional debut with Braga B in a 2016–17 LigaPro match against Cova da Piedade. He was substituted for Xadas at half time in the 1–0 home loss.

Both Jordão and teammate Pedro Neto were loaned to S.S. Lazio from Italy for two years on 31 August 2017, with an obligation to subsequently buy for a combined €26 million. He played only three matches for the Serie A club, starting with a 2–1 away loss to Genoa C.F.C. on 17 February 2019 when he played the final 18 minutes in place of Ștefan Radu.

Wolverhampton Wanderers
On 2 August 2019, Jordão signed to Premier League club Wolverhampton Wanderers. He made his debut for Wolves in an EFL Cup third round tie against Reading on 25 September, in which he was withdrawn with injury shortly after scoring. Jordão made his debut in UEFA club competition football in Wolves' 2019-20 UEFA Europa League Round of 32 second leg away to RCD Espanyol on 27 February 2020. In the final Premier League matchday of the season, he made his league debut as a substitute away at Chelsea.

Jordão agreed a season-long loan move back to his homeland with F.C. Famalicão on 8 September 2020. He scored his first top-flight goal on 18 October with a run from his own half in a 3–3 draw at S.C. Farense. He lost his place in the second half of the season, but his loan was not cut short.

On 9 January 2022, Jordão made his first appearance for Wolves since 26 July 2020, when he came on as a late substitute in a 3–0 victory over Sheffield United at Molineux in the third round of the 2021–22 FA Cup.

Jordão joined Swiss Super League side Grasshopper Club Zürich on loan for the remainder of the 2021–22 season on 31 January 2022. On 23 August that year, he was loaned back to his country's top flight at C.D. Santa Clara. Before making an appearance, he suffered an undisclosed injury that would require surgery in England, ruling him out until 2023.

International career
Jordão had his first call-up to the Portugal under-21 team in May 2018, ahead of a friendly against Italy in Estoril. He came on at half-time for Stephen Eustáquio in the 3–2 win on 25 May.

Career statistics

References

External links

Stats and profile at LPFP 

1998 births
Living people
People from Marinha Grande
Sportspeople from Leiria District
Portuguese footballers
Association football midfielders
Primeira Liga players
Liga Portugal 2 players
Segunda Divisão players
U.D. Leiria players
S.C. Braga B players
F.C. Famalicão players
C.D. Santa Clara players
Serie A players
S.S. Lazio players
Premier League players
Wolverhampton Wanderers F.C. players
Swiss Super League players
Grasshopper Club Zürich players
Portugal youth international footballers
Portuguese expatriate footballers
Expatriate footballers in Italy
Expatriate footballers in England
Expatriate footballers in Switzerland
Portuguese expatriate sportspeople in Italy
Portuguese expatriate sportspeople in England
Portuguese expatriate sportspeople in Switzerland